The 1981 IAAF World Cross Country Championships was held in Madrid, Spain, at the Hipódromo de la Zarzuela on March 28, 1981.   A report on the event was given in the Glasgow Herald.

Complete results for men, junior men, women, medallists,
 and the results of British athletes were published.

Medallists

Race results

Senior men's race (12 km)

 Note: Athletes in parentheses did not score for the team result

Junior men's race (7.25 km)

 Note: Athletes in parentheses did not score for the team result

Senior women's race (4.41 km)

 Note: Athletes in parentheses did not score for the team result

Medal table (unofficial)

 Note: Totals include both individual and team medals, with medals in the team competition counting as one medal.

Participation
An unofficial count yields the participation of 460 athletes from 39 countries.  This is in agreement with the official numbers as published.

  (15)
  (14)
  (15)
  (6)
  (21)
  (21)
  (2)
  (16)
  (21)
  (8)
  (13)
  (20)
  (8)
  (2)
  (21)
  (3)
  (20)
  (9)
  (1)
  (1)
  (5)
  (14)
  (15)
  (10)
  (6)
  (7)
  (21)
  (1)
  (14)
  (20)
  (19)
  (21)
  (1)
  (6)
  (13)
  (1)
  (21)
  (20)
  (8)

See also
 1981 IAAF World Cross Country Championships – Senior men's race
 1981 IAAF World Cross Country Championships – Junior men's race
 1981 IAAF World Cross Country Championships – Senior women's race
 1981 in athletics (track and field)

References

External links 
 The World Cross Country Championships 1973–2005
 GBRathletics
 Athletics Australia

 
World Athletics Cross Country Championships
C
C
Sports competitions in Madrid
International athletics competitions hosted by Spain
Cross country running in Spain
1980s in Madrid